Ryan Donovan (born December 20, 1987) is an American professional ice hockey goaltender who is currently a free agent.

Career 
Donovan attended Finlandia University from 2007 to 2011 where he played in the Midwest Collegiate Hockey Association (MCHA).

Donovan began his professional career during the 2011-12 season by playing 25 games with HC Levy in the Ukrainian Professional Hockey League. On October 10, 2012, he signed a contract with the Utah Grizzlies, and appeared in four ECHL games during the 2012–13 ECHL season. He appeared in 4 games for the Grizzlies and earned a 7.57 Goals Against Average. He signed with the Berlin River Drivers of the Federal Hockey League for the 2015-2016 season. Donovan was named Pro Hockey News Goaltender of the Month for February after recording a 4-0-0-1 record and allowing 28 goals on 170 shots while earning a 4.73 goals-against average and a .876 save percentage. He recorded 7 wins to 9 losses and a 4.91 GAA on the season.

Career Statistics

References

External links

1987 births
American expatriate sportspeople in Ukraine
American men's ice hockey goaltenders
American expatriate ice hockey players in Ukraine
Finlandia University alumni
Ice hockey players from Michigan
Living people
People from Pinckney, Michigan
Sportspeople from Metro Detroit
Utah Grizzlies (ECHL) players